Petar Trifonov (born 13 July 1972) is a Bulgarian diver. He competed in the men's 3 metre springboard event at the 1992 Summer Olympics.

References

External links
 

1972 births
Living people
Bulgarian male divers
Olympic divers of Bulgaria
Divers at the 1992 Summer Olympics
Place of birth missing (living people)